Bromma is a borough (stadsdelsområde) in the western part of Stockholm, Sweden, forming part of the Stockholm Municipality. Bromma is primarily made up of Bromma Parish and Västerled Parish. The fourth largest airport in Sweden and the third largest of the airports close to Stockholm, the Stockholm Bromma Airport, was first built in Bromma in 1936.
 The south-eastern part of Bromma is one of the richest areas in Stockholm.

Description
The districts that make up the borough are Abrahamsberg, Alvik, Beckomberga, Blackeberg, Bromma kyrka, Bällsta, Eneby, Höglandet, Mariehäll, Nockeby, Nockebyhov, Norra Ängby, Olovslund, Riksby, Smedslätten, Stora Mossen, Södra Ängby, Traneberg, Ulvsunda, Ulvsunda Industriområde, Åkeshov, Åkeslund, Ålsten and Äppelviken. , the population is 59,229 in an area of 24.60 km², which gives a density of 2,407.68/km².

Bromma is dotted with tiny forests, parks and lakes, including Judarskogen Nature Reserve,  surrounding Lake Judarn, and the parks around Åkeshov Castle and Ulvsunda Castle. Bromma Church is one of the most distinguished Romanesque churches in the region, celebrated for a complete scheme of wallpaintings by the late medieval artist Albertus Pictor (c. 1440 - c. 1507).

Bromma consists predominantly of high-and medium-income residential neighbourhoods, and the Ulvsunda industrial area. This is situated close to Stockholm-Bromma Airport, the only airport in the city of Stockholm. It was opened in 1936 and serves primarily domestic destinations; with about 1.25 million passengers a year, it is the 2nd largest airport in Stockholm County. Ängby Camping is one of the largest camping lots in Stockholm and is situated close to a large beach by Lake Mälaren.

Subdivision

Famous residents
Bromma is the birthplace of Mats Sundin and Douglas Murray. Per Albin Hansson, Prime Minister of Sweden 1932 to 1946, lived in Ålsten during the last years of his life, and died on the tram in Ålsten in 1946 (while still the Prime Minister). Martin Eriksson, better known as E-Type, moved to Bromma with his family at the age of 14. Sweden's first man in space, Christer Fuglesang, was raised in Bromma. Nobel Prize laureates Gunnar and Alva Myrdal lived at several locations in Bromma along with their children, including writer Jan Myrdal.

Sport
The local football team Brommapojkarna have played in the Allsvenskan. Although not regarded as a major team in Stockholm, it has the largest youth academy in the world. Its main emphasis on producing technical and fast players. 
The local icehockey team is GötaTraneberg.
Sweden´s most famous basketball team, Alviks BK - founded 1956 - has won the Swedish Championship 19 times since 1963.

Economy
When it operated, the charter airline Scanair had its head office in Bromma.

Notable residents
Birgit Rosengren (1912–2011), actress.

See also

Politics of Stockholm
Västerort
Vällingby
Sundbyberg
Solna
Drottningholm

References

External links

 Bromma community page
 Map of Bromma
 Stockholm-Bromma Airport

Boroughs of Stockholm
Västerort